Sonny Williams is a Cook Islands politician and member of the Cook Islands Parliament.  He is a member of the Cook Islands Party.

Williams worked as a civil servant and served as Cultural Development Secretary for the Cook Islands Government. In June 2019 he moved to Infrastructure Cook Islands to work as director for projects and planning. He was first elected to parliament at the 2022 Cook Islands general election, winning the seat of Titikaveka by just three votes. He was confirmed as an MP following an election petition on 11 March 2023.

References

Living people
Cook Island civil servants
Members of the Parliament of the Cook Islands
Cook Islands Party politicians
Year of birth missing (living people)